The South Coast of Massachusetts (sometimes stylized Southcoast) is the region of southeastern Massachusetts consisting of the southern Bristol and Plymouth counties, bordering Buzzards Bay, and includes the cities of Fall River, New Bedford, the southeastern tip of East Taunton and nearby towns. The term is recent, dating to the 1990s, and sometimes confused with the South Shore (a region southeast of Boston that includes eastern Norfolk and Plymouth counties, and does not overlap with the South Coast).

Communities
There are eleven Massachusetts municipalities that are almost always included in the South Coast (total population: 306,588).  Two Rhode Island towns may also be included.
 Acushnet, Massachusetts
 Berkley, Massachusetts
 Dartmouth, Massachusetts
 Fairhaven, Massachusetts
 Fall River, Massachusetts
 Freetown, Massachusetts
 Little Compton, Rhode Island*
 Marion, Massachusetts
 Mattapoisett, Massachusetts
 New Bedford, Massachusetts
 Rochester, Massachusetts
 Somerset, Massachusetts
Swansea, Massachusetts
 Tiverton, Rhode Island*
 Wareham, Massachusetts
 Westport, Massachusetts
*Sometimes included.

Economy
The "South Coast" label was born as a public relations effort to counteract the perceived stigma of former terms like "Greater Fall River," "Greater New Bedford," or "New Bedford-Fall River," which conjured images, in many Massachusetts residents' minds, of depressed mill towns with run-down buildings and high unemployment. Local boosters, including The Standard-Times newspaper, began using the term in the mid-1990s in an effort to attract business to an area with "the Cape's climate," "better infrastructure" and "relatively low land prices," according to Standard-Times publisher William Kennedy.

Transportation

The major highways through the area are Interstate 195 (from Providence to Wareham, Massachusetts) and U.S. Route 6, which is the older route connecting Providence to Cape Cod. Highway access to Boston is provided by Route 24 and Route 79, both of which end in Fall River, and Route 140 which connects New Bedford to Route 24 in Taunton. Limited public transportation is provided by the Southeastern Regional Transit Authority, and the Greater Attleboro Taunton Regional Transit Authority. 

There is a proposal by the MBTA  to connect Fall River and New Bedford to Boston through Taunton via commuter rail, but it does not yet have fully committed funding. As of 2019, Fall River, New Bedford, and Taunton are the only cities in Massachusetts within 60 miles of Boston, not to have a rail service to Boston. Preliminary construction has taken place on the corridor. Freight service to Fall River is the main beneficiary of the South Coast Rail project at this current time. Capacity constraints at South Station are also delaying the project.

Media
The term "South Coast" reportedly began with weather forecasts by Todd Gross on WHDH-TV in Boston. New Bedford's local daily newspaper, The Standard-Times, picked it up in the late 1990s, and other media have followed suit, albeit not without some protest by longtime area residents who protested the manufactured name.

Other newspapers serving the area include The Herald News of Fall River; "The Standard Times" with an online entertainment subsidiary "southcoasttoday.com" of New Bedford; the Taunton Daily Gazette; The Providence Journal; and, for regional coverage, The Boston Globe and Boston Herald. Much of the broadcast media in the area is local to metropolitan Providence and Boston.

Radio stations include ethnic WHTB/1400-Fall River, news/talk/sports WBSM/1420-New Bedford, news/talk/sports WSAR/1480-Fall River, religious ethnic WFHL/88.1-New Bedford, K-Love WTKL/91.1-North Dartmouth, Portuguese-language WJFD-FM/97.3-New Bedford, country WCTK/98.1-New Bedford, top 40/dance WFHN/107.1-Fairhaven, and public radio news WNPN/89.3-Newport, RI.

Television stations include ABC affiliate WLNE-TV/49 (PSIP 6)-New Bedford and CW affiliate WLWC/22 (PSIP 28)-New Bedford.

See also
MetroWest, another region with a recent name

References

1990s neologisms
Regions of Massachusetts